Bythaelurus stewarti, the Error Seamount catshark, is a catshark of the family Scyliorhinidae in the order Carchariniformes. It is endemic to Error Seamount, a guyot located in the Arabian Sea in the western Indian Ocean. Its closest relative is the bristly catshark (B. hispidus), which it differs from in its larger size, darker and more mottled coloration, and especially its smaller and less densely concentrated denticles.

References

Bythaelurus
Fish of the Indian Ocean
Fish described in 2018